Five Points is an unincorporated community in Lawrence County, Tennessee. Five Points has a ZIP code, 38457.

The town's longest-standing business since the 1950s was "Mashburn's General Merchandise". In 2020, the store became "Moore's Country Market".  

The community had a cotton gin, saw mill, feed store, and an elementary school for grades one through eight.

References

Unincorporated communities in Lawrence County, Tennessee
Unincorporated communities in Tennessee